Xylosteus is a genus of beetles of the Staphylinidae family, Lepturinae subfamily.

List of species
 Xylosteus bartoni (Mařan & Obenberger, 1933)
 Xylosteus caucasicola (Plavilstshikov, 1936)
 Xylosteus spinolae (Frivaldsky, 1838)

References
 BioLab - Xylosteus
 zipcodezoo.com - Xylosteus (Genus)

Lepturinae